Aleksi Mustonen (born 28 March 1995) is a Finnish ice hockey player. He currently plays with Ilves of the Finnish Liiga.

He made his SM-liiga debut playing with Jokerit during the 2012–13 SM-liiga season.

References

External links

1995 births
Living people
Finnish ice hockey forwards
Jokerit players
Ice hockey people from Helsinki